The 6K is a Japanese-built electric locomotive used in China. It is developed and built by Kawasaki Heavy Industries and Mitsubishi Electric. The design of 6K is based on JNR Class ED75 and EF66 electric locomotives. It is the first locomotive with Bo-Bo-Bo wheel arrangement used in China.

Production
In total 85 6Ks were built between 1986 and 1987.

Equipment
Each 6K locomotive uses CLG-616 phase splitter and 6 Mitsubishi Electric MB-530-AVR DC traction motors.

Performance
6K was one of the most reliable electric locomotives in China compared with SS1, SS2 and SS3 at the time of entering service.  China later made SS7 locomotive with reference to the Tri-Bo wheel arrangement of 6K, the breakdown rate, however, was still high, until its modified version SS7B, SS7C and SS7D designed.

See also
 China Railways SS7

External links 
 Product information (Kawasaki)
 6K (Railways of China)

25 kV AC locomotives
Bo-Bo-Bo locomotives
6K
Kawasaki locomotives
Railway locomotives introduced in 1986
Standard gauge locomotives of China